Whakamaru Power Station is a hydroelectric power station on the Waikato River, in the North Island of New Zealand. It is the fourth hydroelectric power station on the Waikato River.

Lake Whakamaru is one of the larger hydro reservoirs on the Waikato river. The power station is owned and operated by Mercury Energy. The adjacent Whakamaru switching station is operated by Transpower and is one of eight reference nodes on the New Zealand national grid.

History

The foundation rock turned out to be deeply cracked and filled with clays rendering it partially porous. Shafts were sunk into the rock and this allowed the clay to be cleared and cement grout was later forced into the rock which was then back-filled with concrete.

Transmission
Whakamaru is a major node in the North Island electricity grid. Electricity generated by Whakamaru and the other five Waikato hydroelectric power stations, and the geothermal power stations in the area, converges at the Whakamaru substation on the western side of the dam. It is transmitted from there via 220 kV lines to the Bay of Plenty, Hawke's Bay, Manawatu and Hamilton.

The main control centre for the electricity generation and transmission system for the entire North Island was established at Whakamaru in 1964.  The facility continued to operate as the North Island System Control Centre until a replacement facility was established at Hamilton in 1992.

In 2010–2012 the Whakamaru to Brownhill Road transmission line, a major line, was constructed to Brownhill Road, close to the south Auckland urban boundary. This reinforced supply lines to Auckland and allowed for the large amount of new geothermal generation that was expected in the Taupo region over the following 5–7 years.

Refurbishment
In 2013 a refurbishment project was begun to refurbish the turbines and generators.  The first equipment arrived at site in 2016 and was installed and commissioned on the first unit in 2017. The generator replacement parts were supplied by GE Renewables.  The new turbine components were supplied by Andritz Hydro. By 2020, all units had been refurbished and the total generation capacity increased from 100 MW to 124 MW.

References

Further reading

External links

Energy infrastructure completed in 1949
Energy infrastructure completed in 1956
Hydroelectric power stations in New Zealand
Buildings and structures in Waikato
Waikato River
Dams in New Zealand